The 1900 Svenska Mästerskapet was the fifth season of Svenska Mästerskapet, the football Cup to determine the Swedish champions. AIK won the tournament by defeating Örgryte IS in the final with a 1–0 score.

Final

References 

Print

1900
Masterskapet
Svenska